Borsonia brasiliana is a species of sea snail, a marine gastropod mollusk in the family Borsoniidae.

Description
The size of the shell attains 13 mm. It has a characteristic sinistral coiling of the shell.

Distribution
This marine species occurs off Northeast Brasil.

References

  Don L. Tippett, .A new sinistral turrid from Brazil (Gastropoda: Turridae); The Nautilus v.97 (1983)

brasiliana
Gastropods described in 1983